Thomas Weissenberger (born 28 May 1971) is an Austrian former footballer who played as a striker. He made one appearance for the Austria national team. He is the brother of Markus Weissenberger.

References

Living people
1971 births
Association football forwards
Austrian footballers
Austria international footballers
1. FC Nürnberg players
LASK players
FC Admira Wacker Mödling players
First Vienna FC players